Jef Van Der Linden (2 November 1927 – 8 May 2008) was a Belgian football defender who was a member of the Belgium national team at the 1954 FIFA World Cup. However, he never earned a cap for Belgium.

Club career
He also played for Royal Antwerp.

References

External links

1927 births
2008 deaths
Belgian footballers
Association football defenders
Royal Antwerp F.C. players
1954 FIFA World Cup players